Petunia Pig is an animated cartoon character in the Looney Tunes and Merrie Melodies series of cartoons from Warner Bros. She looks much like her significant other, Porky Pig, except that she wears a dress and has pigtailed black hair.

Biography
Petunia was introduced by animator Frank Tashlin in the 1937 short Porky's Romance. The film is a parody of a 1932 Walt Disney cartoon called Mickey's Nightmare. Whereas Mickey Mouse marries his longtime girlfriend Minnie in that film, Porky's overtures toward Petunia bring him only the scornful laughter of his porcine paramour. Tashlin adopted Petunia as a regular member of Porky's entourage and featured her in two more cartoons: The Case of the Stuttering Pig and Porky's Double Trouble, both in 1937.

Bob Clampett was the only other Warner director to utilize Petunia after Tashlin left the studio in 1938. He first featured her in Porky's Picnic, a 1939 film that sees Porky tormented by his nephew Pinkie. Pinkie and Porky's encounters are always out of sight of Petunia, of course, so she blames Porky for everything that goes wrong as a result of Pinkie's activity. Petunia's largest role came in Clampett's 1939 short Naughty Neighbors. The film borrows elements from both the famous feud between the Hatfields and McCoys as well as Romeo and Juliet as Porky and Petunia's love for each other is stymied by their respective hillbilly families' mutual hatred. Despite her more prominent role in the short, Petunia is only a supporting character; Porky remains the star.

As Porky's popularity was eclipsed in the late 1930s and early 1940s by brasher characters like Daffy Duck and Bugs Bunny, he was relegated to a supporting player himself in new Looney Tunes and Merrie Melodies shorts. Petunia, already a bit player to Porky's lead, fared much worse. She still appeared occasionally in Warner's merchandising, but her tenure as a Warner Bros. player was mostly over.

Later appearances
Nevertheless, in modern years Petunia has appeared in multiple new roles:

 Petunia has a co-starring role in Filmation's lone Looney Tunes-related production, Daffy Duck and Porky Pig Meet the Groovie Goolies, in 1972. She is voiced by Jane Webb.
 Petunia made a cameo appearance in the 1979 short Bugs Bunny's Christmas Carol as Mrs. Cratchit, wife of Bob Cratchit (played by Porky Pig), though she had no speaking lines.
 Originally Petunia intended to appear as a cameo with Porky in the film Who Framed Roger Rabbit in the deleted scene "Acme's Funeral".
 Petunia made a cameo appearance in Tiny Toon Adventures in the episode "It's a Wonderful Tiny Toon Christmas Special".
 An infant version of Petunia was a recurring character in the Baby Looney Tunes television series, where she was voiced by Chiara Zanni.
 The regular adult Petunia is an occasional guest star in DC's Looney Tunes comic book and appeared frequently in 2001-2005 webtoons on the official Looney Tunes website.
 She also turned up in Duck Dodgers, playing the role of Princess Incense (voiced by Jodi Benson).
 Petunia appeared on The Looney Tunes Show in the episodes "Here Comes the Pig" and "Mr. Wiener", voiced by Katy Mixon.
 Petunia is a playable character in the mobile game "Looney Tunes: World of Mayhem", along with Farmer, Lunar, and Athena variants of herself. 
 Petunia appears in several New Looney Tunes segments, voiced by Jessica DiCicco.
 Petunia also appears in Looney Tunes Cartoons, voiced by Lara Jill Miller, which for the first time she has a solo appearance. In this portrayal, she has a Brooklyn accent similar to Bugs Bunny.
 Petunia appears in Bugs Bunny Builders, voiced by Alex Cazares.

External links
League of Comic Geeks page
Behind the Voice Actors

References

Pig, Petunia
Pig, Petunia
Film characters introduced in 1937
Female characters in animation